The 2018 Harrogate Borough Council election  took  place on 3 May 2018 to elect members of Harrogate Borough Council in England. This was on the same day as other local elections.

Current composition as a result of the election.

Ward results

Bishop Monkton and Newby

Boroughbridge

Claro

Fountains & Ripley

Harrogate Bilton Grange

Harrogate Bilton Woodfield

Harrogate Central

Harrogate Coppice Valley

Harrogate Duchy

Harrogate Fairfax

Harrogate Harlow

Harrogate High Harrogate

Harrogate Hookstone

Harrogate Kingsley

Harrogate New Park

Harrogate Oatlands

Harrogate Old Bilton

Harrogate Pannal

Harrogate Saltergate

Harrogate St Georges

Harrogate Starbeck

Harrogate Stray

Harrogate Valley Gardens

Killinghall & Hampsthwaite

Knaresborough Aspin & Calcutt

Knaresborough Castle

Knaresborough Eastfield

Knaresborough Scriven Park

Marston Moor

Masham & Kirkby Malzeard

Nidd Valley

Ouseburn

Pateley Bridge & Nidderdale Moors

Ripon Minster

Ripon Moorside

Ripon Spa

Ripon Ure Bank

Spofforth with Lower Wharfedale

Washburn

Wathvale

By-Elections
A by-election was held in Knaresborough Scriven Park on 29 July 2021.

References

2018 English local elections
2018
2010s in North Yorkshire